Year 1510 (MDX) was a common year starting on Tuesday (link will display the full calendar) of the Julian calendar.

Events 

 January–June 
 January – Catherine of Aragon gives birth to her first child, a stillborn daughter.
 January 23 – An 18-year-old Henry VIII of England jousts anonymously at Richmond, Surrey and draws applause, before revealing his identity.
 February 27–November 25 – Portuguese conquest of Goa: Afonso de Albuquerque of Portugal conquers Goa.
 March 1 – Battle of Salt River: Indigenous ǃUriǁʼaekua decisively defeat sailors of the Portuguese Empire in South Africa.
 May 12 – The Prince of Anhua rebellion begins when Zhu Zhifan, Prince of Anhua, kills all the officials invited to a banquet, and declares his intent on ousting the powerful Ming dynasty eunuch Liu Jin, during the reign of the Zhengde Emperor in China.
 May 30 – Rebel leader Zhu Zhifan is defeated and captured by commander Qiu Yue, ending the Prince of Anhua rebellion.

 July–December 
 July – The Holy League, formed to defend the Italian States, attacks French-occupied Genoa. The 1510 influenza pandemic reaches Sicily, where it is nicknamed coccolucio, before spreading to the Italian states and the rest of Europe.
 August 10 – The Royal Dano-Norwegian Navy is founded.
 October 16 – Mingyi Nyo declares independence from the Ava Kingdom in upper Burma, by establishing the Toungoo dynasty.
 December 2 – Battle of Marv: Shah Ismail I's defeats the Uzbek forces of Shaybani Khan, in Khorasan. Shaybani flees the battle only to be captured and killed by Ismail I troops, his head is turned into a Skull cup used as a drinking goblet.

 Date Unknown
 The Grand Prince of Moscow Vasili III conquers Pskov.
 Sir Thomas More becomes undersheriff of the City of London.
 Paolo Cortese publishes De Cardinalatu, a manual for cardinals, including advice on palatial architecture – which inspires Thomas Wolsey in his construction work at Hampton Court Palace.
 Heinrich Cornelius Agrippa moves to Italy.
 Sunflowers are brought to Europe.
 The Mary Rose ship is laid out. The next year the ship is built and complete in 1512. By the time the battle sank the ship in England.

Births 

 February 24 – Costanzo II Sforza, Italian noble (d. 1512)
 March 25 – Guillaume Postel, French linguist (d. 1581)
 March 30 – Antonio de Cabezón, Spanish composer and organist (d. 1566)
 June 6 – Giovanni Battista Cicala, Italian Catholic cardinal (d. 1570)
 June 22 – Alessandro de' Medici, Duke of Florence (d. 1537)
 August 11 – Margaret Paleologa, Sovereign Marchioness of Montferrat (1531–1540) (d. 1566)
 August 24 – Elisabeth of Brandenburg, Duchess of Brunswick-Calenberg-Göttingen (1525–1540) (d. 1558)
 October 6 
 Rowland Taylor, English Protestant martyr (d. 1555)
 John Caius, English physician (d. 1573)
 October 25 – Renée of France, French princess (d. 1574)
 October 28 – Francis Borgia, Spanish General of the Jesuits (d. 1572)
 December 28 – Nicholas Bacon, English politician (d. 1579)
 date unknown 
Jan Matsys, Flemish painter (d. 1575)
 Jörg Breu the Younger, German painter (d. 1547)
 Ferenc Dávid, Hungarian founder of the Unitarian Church (d. 1579)
 Solomon Luria, Polish-born Kabbalist (d. 1574)
 Oda Nobuhide, Japanese warlord (d. 1551)
 Bernard Palissy, French potter and writer
 Elizabeth Lucar, English calligrapher (d. 1537)
Ambroise Paré, French surgeon (d. 1590)
Nicolas Durand de Villegaignon, French naval officer (d. 1571)
Pierre de Manchicourt, Flemish composer (d. 1564)
Gracia Mendes Nasi, Ottoman businessperson and philanthropist (d. 1569)
Beatriz de la Cueva, Governor of Guatemala (d. 1541)
Francisco Vázquez de Coronado, Spanish conquistador (d. 1554)
 probable
 Tullia d'Aragona, Italian poet, author and philosopher (d. 1556)
 Aloysius Lilius, Italian inventor of the Gregorian calendar (d. 1576)
 Luis de Morales, Spanish religious painter (d. 1586)
 Lope de Rueda, Spanish dramatist and author (d. 1565)
 Lawrence Sheriff, Elizabethan gentleman and grocer (d. 1567)
 Claudio Veggio, Italian composer
 John Knox, Scottish reformer (d. 1572 )

Deaths 

 February 1 – Sidonie of Poděbrady, Bohemian princess, duchess consort of Saxony (b. 1449)
 February 28 – Juan de la Cosa, Spanish cartographer and explorer (b. c. 1460)
 March 1 – Francisco de Almeida, Portuguese soldier and explorer (b. c. 1450)
 March 10 – Johann Geiler von Kaisersberg, German preacher (b. 1445)
 March 12 – Mihnea cel Rău, Prince of Wallachia (b. c.1460)
 May 17 – Sandro Botticelli, Italian painter (b. 1445)
May 25 – Cardinal Georges d'Ambroise, aka Monseigneur le Ledat. Adviser to King Louis XII of France. (b. 1460)
 July 10 – Catherine Cornaro, Queen of Cyprus (b. 1454)
 July 14 – Arthur Stewart, Duke of Rothesay, heir to the Scottish throne (b. 1509)
 July 27 – Giovanni Sforza, Italian condottiere (b. 1466)
 August 17 
 Edmund Dudley, English statesman (b. c. 1462)
 Richard Empson, English statesman
 September 15 – Saint Catherine of Genoa (b. 1447)
 September 18 – Ursula of Brandenburg, Duchess of Mecklenburg-Schwerin (b. 1488)
 November 11 – Bohuslav Hasištejnský z Lobkovic, Bohemian writer (b. 1461)
 December 2 – Muhammad Shaybani, Khan of Bukhara (b. 1451)
 December 14 – Friedrich of Saxony (b. 1473)
 December 31 – Bianca Maria Sforza, Holy Roman Empress (b. 1472)
 date unknown 
 Agüeybaná, Taino chief
 Giovanna d'Aragona, Duchess of Amalfi, Italian regent (b. 1478)
 Ambrogio Calepino, Italian lexicographer (b. 1450)
 Giorgione, Italian painter (b. c. 1477)
 Mandukhai Khatun, Mongolian queen

References